Allison Grodner is an American director, producer and writer, who has worked in documentary and reality-based programming. She is best known for her work on the American version of the reality TV show Big Brother. She is an executive producer of Big Brother and Big Brother: After Dark. Grodner is also executive producer of She's Got the Look on TV LAND, You're Cut Off! on VH1,  reality series Plain Jane and Remodeled on The CW, and Battle of the Ex Besties on Oxygen.

Grodner won Emmy Awards in 1999 and 2001 for Outstanding Children's Program for The Teen Files, shared with Arnold Shapiro.

References

External links

American television directors
American television producers
American women television producers
American Jews
American television writers
American women television directors
Living people
Place of birth missing (living people)
Year of birth missing (living people)
American reality television producers
American women television writers
21st-century American women